Parookaville (short:  'PV' ) is a German three-day music festival in the field of electronic dance music, which has been taking place annually since 2015 in Weeze am Airport. Parookaville is known for its elaborately designed show concept, in which the festival is staged as a separate city.

Line-Up

See also
 List of electronic music festivals
 Live electronic music

References

External links 
 Official Parookaville website

Music festivals established in 2015
Electronic music festivals in Germany
Kleve (district)
2015 establishments in Germany